Roche Tower 2 is a skyscraper in the Swiss city of Basel. With a height of 205 meters the building will replace Roche Tower 1 as tallest building in Switzerland after the planned opening on 2 September 2022.

The building was financed by pharmaceutical company Hoffmann-La Roche and designed by Herzog & de Meuron. It accommodates 1700 employees. The skyscraper is resistant towards earthquakes with a magnitude of 6.9 on the Richter magnitude scale.

Gallery

References

External links 
 Roche Tower 2 at wh-p Ingenieure AG

Buildings and structures in Basel
Skyscrapers in Switzerland
Skyscraper office buildings